Cambridge Academy for Higher Education “Arabic: اكاديمية كامبردج للدراسات العليا  ” is a Middle Eastern university dedicated to executive education and leadership programs with a campus in United Arab Emirates, Fujairah at Fujairah Free Zone. The University is dedicated to educating leaders who will make a difference in the Middle East. Academic offers selective degree programs include Master of Business Administration (MBA), Master of Management among other majors, Doctor of Business Administration (DBA) and PhD programs, in addition to academic programs offered by the Institute of HealthCare Research in health as Master of Public Health (MPH), Master of Health Administration, Master of Health Economics and Doctor in Public Health (DrPH). The School of Management flagship program is the double master's degree in Business Administration and Health Administration MBA/MHA.

Academic programs
Every student's program is individually structured according to educational background, work experience and future plans. Teaching methods include case studies, lectures, peer-to-peer learning, tutorials, group work, simulations and role-plays.

Executive Education
‘Executive education’ provides an understanding of leadership and decision-making for an individual or teams. It includes courses in the fields of leadership, management, and business administration while ‘Professional education’ covers programs designed to develop new knowledge or extend existing capabilities in an individual or teams engaged in a relevant professional discipline. This form of education is specific to an industry or skill set, such as Human Resources.

Executive Education Committee
The Committee was formed in 2012 to develop and evaluate programs offered to the market, The Committee works with the University Professors and a wide range of industry experts to ensure the maximum return of investment to individuals and teams enrolled into the programs.
The Committee works with selective industry and subject matter experts from the globe in addition to professors from the University and reputable business schools in United States, United Kingdom and Europe to provide degree awarding executive education programs (certification, diploma, courses and even for executive MBA and DBA) and non-degree training programs.

Corporate University is strength of the University, Cambridge Academy for Higher Education supports leading multinational corporations and government agencies to build strategic educational entity exclusively to assist the parent organization in achieving its goals by conducting activities that foster individual and organizational learning and knowledge.

Institute of Healthcare Research
The Institute of Healthcare Research at Cambridge conducts studies & research leveraging on the University's talented and enthusiastic researchers, supervised by professors and supported by a highly qualified team of industry experts.

The Institute of Healthcare Research is the exclusive sponsor of Iraq Health, a nonprofit nongovernmental think tank, focusing on promoting the role of private sector in reforming the health system in Iraq. Iraq Health organizes the annual Iraq Health Conference & Exhibition and Iraq HealthCare Conference among a number of activities in the country and the region to achieve its goal.

Education Management
The University launched a business venture with a major investment group in Abu Dhabi to modernize education using international curriculum and state of art technology in primary and secondary education. The plan is to expand within UAE.

References

External links
  Official Site

Universities and colleges in the Emirate of Fujairah